Johannes Gerardus Maria "Hans" Alders (born 17 December 1952) is a retired Dutch politician Labour Party (PvdA) and businessman. He is the Chairman of the Supervisory board of rail transport company ProRail since 27 June 2014. He is also chairman of the Alders tables for the airports Schiphol, Eindhoven and Lelystad. Alders was previously Minister of Housing, Spatial Planning and the Environment (1989—1994) and Queen's Commissioner (1996—2007) in the province of Groningen. Hans Alders was National Coordinator Groningen from 1 June 2015. On 30 May 2018 he announced his resignation.

Career 
Alders was a PvdA member of parliament, minister and administrator. He did not complete any secondary education and developed through self-study. He was soon a leading member of the PvdA party in the House of Representatives. He was spokesman for civil servants, among other things, and later secretary of the PvdA faction and confidant of Wim Kok. As Minister of Housing, Spatial Planning and the Environment in the Lubbers III cabinet,  Alders presented memorandums on spatial planning (Vinex) and environmental policy (NMP-plus). After his ministry, he switched to an international position.

Alders was Queen's Commissioner in the province of Groningen from 1996 to 2007. On 1 September 2007 he was succeeded by Max van den Berg.

After his period as a politician, he held a large number of positions. On 1 October 2007 Alders became chairman of the board of EnergieNED. He is also chairman of the Supervisory Board of the University Medical Center Groningen.

Alders was discredited because of his many well-paid ancillary positions. In 2005, after an investigation by a national weekly newspaper, Alders made the news because of all the Queen's Commissioners, he had the highest income from ancillary positions. He collected 48,000 euros a year from the Pension Fund for Health, Mental and Social Interests (PGGM) and more than 17,000 euros from Gasunie. Alders managed — as far as is known — to almost double his income as a former Queen's Commissioner with ancillary income. Commissioners earned a minister's salary: 122,000 euros per year. Alders earned at least 212,689 euros annually.

In 2008 Hans Alders became chairman of the Alderstafel, which resulted in a recommendation about noise pollution at Schiphol Airport. These consultations under his chairmanship also led to a sharp increase in the number of flights to and from Schiphol. Since 2008, 446,629 (Annual Report Schiphol 2009) flight movements up to 2018 against 500,000. From October 2008 to October 2011, Alders chaired the Taskforce on Biodiversity and Natural Resources. This task force was intended to make suggestions to the government for the long-term conservation and sustainable use of biodiversity. On 27 June 2014 Alders was appointed chairman of the Supervisory Board of Prorail with effect from 1 July that year.

In 2014, Alders had more than 20 jobs. That year, he was also appointed chairman of the supervisory board of ProRail. 

On 1 May 2015 it was announced that Alders would become the National Coordinator for Groningen as of June 1.  Alders was thus put in charge of a new government agency to be formed of more than 100 civil servants from central government, province and municipalities. This government agency must better regulate the handling of earthquake damage and the reinforcement of buildings in the earthquake zone in Groningen (as a result of gas extraction in the Slochteren natural gas field). 

As chairman of the supervisory board of ProRail, he decided in September 2015 not to provide two internal documents about Prorail's financial situation, which were requested by the House of Representatives. In the end, the documents were leaked through the De Telegraaf newspaper.

Personal 
Alders married in 1972 and has a daughter. His wife died in 2007 of an incurable disease, a day before he was due to retire as Queen's Commissioner.

Decorations

References

External links

Official
  J.G.M. (Hans) Alders Parlement & Politiek

 
 

 

 

1950 births
Living people
Commanders of the Order of Orange-Nassau
Dutch corporate directors
Dutch chief executives in the healthcare industry
Dutch chief executives in the rail transport industry
Dutch management consultants
Dutch nonprofit directors
Dutch nonprofit executives
Dutch officials of the United Nations
Dutch political consultants
Dutch trade association executives
Knights of the Order of the Netherlands Lion
King's and Queen's Commissioners of Groningen
Labour Party (Netherlands) politicians
Members of the House of Representatives (Netherlands)
Ministers of Housing and Spatial Planning of the Netherlands
People from Nijmegen
Politicians from The Hague
20th-century Dutch civil servants
20th-century Dutch politicians
21st-century Dutch businesspeople
21st-century Dutch civil servants
21st-century Dutch politicians